José Luis Artetxe Muguire (28 June 1930 – 19 March 2016) was a Spanish footballer who played as a striker.

Club career
Born in Algorta, Biscay, Artetxe joined Athletic Bilbao in 1950 from neighbouring CD Getxo. He went on to spend the remainder of his 16-year career with the former club, making his La Liga debut on 10 September in a 4–0 home win against Atlético Madrid.

In the 1955–56 season, Artetxe contributed with 24 games and 15 goals to help the team win the sixth league championship in their history. During his spell at the San Mamés Stadium he amassed overall totals of 346 matches and 133 goals, also conquering three Copa del Generalísimo trophies (scoring in the 1956 edition, a 2–1 triumph over Atlético Madrid); several years after his retirement, at the age or 35, he still ranked amongst his main club's all-time scorers.

International career
Artetxe earned six caps for Spain, during five years. His debut came on 17 March 1954 in a 2–2 draw against Turkey for the 1954 FIFA World Cup qualifiers, where he scored the game's first goal in Rome; it was already the third match between the two countries, and the opposition would eventually reach the finals in Switzerland after a drawing of lots.

Death
Artetxe died in his hometown on 19 March 2016, aged 85.

Honours
Athletic Bilbao
La Liga: 1955–56
Copa del Generalísimo: 1955, 1956, 1958
Copa Eva Duarte: 1950

References

External links

1930 births
2016 deaths
Spanish footballers
Footballers from Getxo
Association football forwards
La Liga players
Tercera División players
CD Getxo players
Athletic Bilbao footballers
Spain B international footballers
Spain international footballers